Dibrugarh–Kanyakumari Vivek Superfast Express is a weekly Express train of the Vivek Express series the Indian Railways which runs from Dibrugarh in India's north eastern state Assam to Kanyakumari in Tamil Nadu the southernmost state of India. This train is currently the longest train route in India by both distance and time, as well as the 24th-longest train service in the world. The train has 58 halts across its route.

History
Vivek Express (now Vivek Super Fast Express) are four pairs of Express Trains on the Indian Railways network. These trains were announced in the Railway Budget of 2011-12 by the then Railway Minister Mamata Banerjee. These trains were started to commemorate the 150th birth anniversary of Swami Vivekananda.

Vivek express also holds another place in the history of Indian railways, as being the last train to halt its services, when the entire Indian railway passenger services came to standstill following the COVID19 pandemic and the subsequent nationwide lockdown in March 2020.

Dibrugarh - Kanyakumari Vivek Express joins Dibrugarh in Assam, North-East India to Kanyakumari, Tamil Nadu which is the southernmost tip of India. The train No:15906 starts from Dibrugarh  at 19:25 PM and reaches Kanyakumari at 22:00 PM on the fifth day of journey. In the return direction the train no: 15905 leaves Kanyakumari at 17:20 PM and reaches Dibrugarh at 20:50 PM on the fifth day of the journey. This train also passes through Sahibganj district and Pakur district of Jharkhand but it does not have any stoppages there.

Coach composition
It now runs with modern LHB rakes. The coach composition is
 3 general coaches
 11 sleeper coaches
 1 pantry coach
 1 AC 2-Tier
 4 AC 3-Tier
 2 End On Generators(Only for LHB coach)

Locomotive
Than it is hauled by WAP-7 Locomotive of Electric Loco Shed, Howrah from  upto .

See also
 Vivek Express
 Himsagar Express
 Longest train services
 Longest train services of Indian Railways
Tambaram–Guwahati Express
Bangalore-Guwahati Express
Thiruvananthapuram–Silchar Superfast Express
New Tinsukia-Bengaluru Express
Bangalore-Agartala Humsafar Express
Chennai–New Jalpaiguri Superfast Express
Yesvantpur–Kamakhya AC Superfast Express

References

External links 

Vivek Express trains
Rail transport in Assam
Rail transport in Kerala
Rail transport in Nagaland
Rail transport in Tamil Nadu
Rail transport in West Bengal
Rail transport in Bihar
Rail transport in Odisha
Rail transport in Andhra Pradesh
Railway services introduced in 2011
Transport in Dibrugarh
Transport in Kanyakumari